The 2011 Idaho State Bengals football team represented Idaho State University as a member of the Big Sky Conference during the 2011 NCAA Division I FCS football season. Led by first-year head coach Mike Kramer, the Bengals compiled an overall record of 2–9 with a mark of 1–7 in conference play, placing eighth in the Big Sky. Idaho State played their home games at Holt Arena in Pocatello, Idaho.

In the Spring of 2011, Idaho state was one of three teams ruled ineligible for the season's NCAA Division I Football Championship playoffs due to Academic Progress Rate (APR) violations.

Schedule

References

External links
 2011 Media Guide at isubengals.com

Idaho State
Idaho State Bengals football seasons
Idaho State Bengals football